Immurement (from the Latin , "in" and , "wall"; literally "walling in"), also called immuration or live entombment, is a form of imprisonment, usually until death, in which someone is placed within an enclosed space without exits. This includes instances where people have been enclosed in extremely tight confinement, such as within a coffin. When used as a means of execution, the prisoner is simply left to die from starvation or dehydration. This form of execution is distinct from being buried alive, in which the victim typically dies of asphyxiation.

Notable examples of immurement as an established execution practice (with death from thirst or starvation as the intended aim) are attested. Women in the Roman Empire who were Vestal Virgins faced live entombment as punishment when they were found guilty of breaking their chastity vows. Immurement has also been well established as a punishment of robbers in Persia, even into the early 20th century. Some ambiguous evidence exists of immurement as a practice of coffin-type confinement in Mongolia. One Immurement Execution was done with, Anarkali, India by Emperor Akbar because Anarkali
had an illicit relationship with Emperor Jahangir   

However, isolated incidents of immurement, rather than elements of continuous traditions, are attested or alleged from numerous other parts of the world as well, and some of these notable incidents are included. Instances of immurement as an element of massacre within the context of war or revolution are also noted. Entombing living persons as a type of human sacrifice is also reported, for example, as part of grand burial ceremonies in some cultures.

As a motif in legends and folklore, many tales of immurement exist. In the folklore, immurement is prominent as a form of capital punishment, but its use as a type of human sacrifice to make buildings sturdy has many tales attached to it as well. Skeletal remains have been, from time to time, found behind walls and in hidden rooms and on several occasions have been asserted to be evidence of such sacrificial practices or of such a form of punishment.

History

Europe

According to Finnish legends, a young maiden was wrongfully immured into the castle wall of Olavinlinna as a punishment for treason. The subsequent growth of a rowan tree at the location of her execution, whose flowers were as white as her innocence and berries as red as her blood, inspired a ballad. Similar legends stem from Haapsalu, Kuressaare, Põlva and Visby.

According to a Latvian legend as many as three people might have been immured in tunnels under the Grobiņa Castle. A daughter of a knight living in the castle did not approve of her father's choice of a young nobleman as her future husband. Said knight also pillaged surrounding areas and took prisoners to live in the tunnels, among these a handsome young man whom the daughter took a liking to, helping him escape. Her fate was not so lucky as the knight and his future son-in-law punished her by immuring her in one of the tunnels. Another nobleman's daughter and a Swedish soldier are also said to be immured in one of the tunnels after she had fallen in love with the Swedish soldier and requested her father to allow her to marry him. According to another legend, a maiden and a servant have been immured after a failed attempt at spying on Germans wanting to know what their plans were for what is now Latvia.

In book 3 of his History of the Peloponnesian War, Thucydides goes into great detail on the revolution that broke out at Corfu in 427 BC. Book three, chapter 81, passage five reads as follows:

The Vestal Virgins in ancient Rome constituted a class of priestesses whose principal duty was to maintain the sacred fire dedicated to Vesta (goddess of the home and the family), and they lived under a strict vow of chastity and celibacy. If that vow of chastity was broken, the offending priestess was immured alive as follows:

The order of the Vestal Virgins existed for about 1,000 years, but only about 10 effected immurements are attested in extant sources.

Flavius Basiliscus, emperor in the Eastern Roman Empire from AD 475–476, was deposed. In winter he was sent to Cappadocia with his family, where they were imprisoned in either a dry cistern, or a tower, and perished. The historian Procopius said they died exposed to cold and hunger, while other sources, such as Priscus, merely speaks of death by starvation.

The patriarch of Aquileia, Poppo of Treffen (r. 1019–1045), was a mighty secular potentate, and in 1044 he sacked Grado. The newly elected Doge of Venice, Domenico I Contarini, captured him and allegedly let him be buried up to his neck, and left guards to watch over him until he died.

In 1149 Duke Otto III of Olomouc of the Moravian Přemyslid dynasty immured the abbot Deocar and 20 monks in the refectory in the monastery of Rhadisch, where they starved to death. Ostensibly this was because one of the monks had fondled his wife Duranna when she had spent the night there. However, Otto III confiscated the monastery's wealth, and some said this was the motive for the immurement.

In the ruins of Thornton Abbey, Lincolnshire, an immured skeleton was found behind a wall along with a table, book and a candlestick. By some, he is believed to be the fourteenth abbot, immured for some crime he had committed.

The actual punishment meted out to men found guilty of paederasty (homosexual intercourse with boys) might vary between different status groups. In 1409 and 1532 in Augsburg, two men were burned alive for their offences, but a rather different procedure was meted out to four clerics in the 1409 case, guilty of the same offence. Instead of being burned alive, they were locked into a wooden casket that was hung up in the Perlachturm, and they starved to death.

After confessing in an Inquisition Court to an alleged conspiracy involving lepers, the Jewry, the King of Granada, and the Sultan of Babylon, Guillaume Agassa, head of the leper asylum at Lestang, was condemned in 1322 to be immured in shackles for life.

Hungarian countess Elizabeth Báthory de Ecsed (Báthory Erzsébet in Hungarian; 1560–1614) was immured in a set of rooms in 1610 for the death of several girls, with figures being as high as several hundred, though the actual number of victims is uncertain. Being labeled the most prolific female serial killer in history has earned her the nickname of the "Blood Countess", and she is often compared with Vlad III the Impaler of Wallachia in folklore. She was allowed to live in immurement until she died, four years after being sealed, ultimately dying of causes other than starvation; evidently her rooms were well supplied with food.

Asceticism
A particularly severe form of asceticism within Christianity is that of anchorites, who typically allowed themselves to be immured, and subsisting on minimal food. For example, in the 4th century AD, one nun named Alexandra immured herself in a tomb for ten years with a tiny aperture enabling her to receive meager provisions. Saint Jerome (c. 340–420) spoke of one follower who spent his entire life in a cistern, consuming no more than five figs a day.

In Catholic monastic tradition, there existed a type of enforced, solitary confinement for nuns or monks who had broken their vows of chastity, or espoused heretical ideas. As Henry Charles Lea puts it, the tradition seems to have been that of complete, utter isolation from other human beings, but that food was, indeed, provided:

In the footnote appended to this passage, Lea writes:

Although the  tradition therefore seems to one of perpetual confinement, but not immurement where the individual was meant to starve to death. However, Sir Walter Scott, himself an antiquarian, notes in a remark to his epic poem Marmion (1808):

The practice of immuring nuns or monks on breaches of chastity has a long history, and Francesca Medioli writes the following in her essay "Dimensions of the Cloister":

Asia
In the ancient Sumerian city of Ur some graves (as early as 2500 BC.) clearly show the burial of attendants, along with that of the principal dead person. In one such grave, as Gerda Lerner wrote on page 60 of her book The Creation of Patriarchy:

The Neo-Assyrian Empire is notorious for its brutal repression techniques, not the least of those reasons being because several of its rulers congratulated themselves upon the vengeance they wrought by going into detail of how they dealt with their enemies. Here is a commemoration Ashurnasirpal II (r. 883–859 BC) made that includes immurement:

Émile Durkheim in his work Suicide writes the following about certain followers of Amida Buddha:

By popular legend, Anarkali was immured between two walls in Lahore by order of Mughal Emperor Akbar for having a relationship with crown prince Salim (later Emperor Jehangir) in the 16th century. A bazaar developed around the site, and was named Anarkali Bazaar in her honour.
A tradition existed in Persia of walling up criminals and leaving them to die of hunger or thirst. The traveller M. E. Hume-Griffith stayed in Persia from 1900 to 1903, and she wrote the following:

Travelling back and forth to Persia from 1630 to 1668 as a gem merchant, Jean-Baptiste Tavernier observed much the same custom that Hume-Griffith noted some 250 years later. Tavernier notes that immuring was principally a punishment for thieves, and that immurement left the convict's head out in the open. According to him, many of these individuals would implore passers-by to cut off their heads, an amelioration of the punishment forbidden by law. John Fryer, travelling Persia in the 1670s, writes the following:

In the late 1650s, various sons of the Mughal emperor Shah Jahan became embroiled in wars of succession, in which Aurangzeb was victorious. One of his half-brothers, Shah Shujah proved particularly troublesome, but in 1661 Aurangzeb defeated him, and Shah Shuja and his family sought the protection of the King of Arakan. According to Francois Bernier, the King reneged on his promise of asylum, and Shuja's sons were decapitated, while his daughters were immured, and died of starvation.

During Mughal rule in early 18th century India, the two youngest sons of Guru Gobind Singh were sentenced to death by being bricked alive for their refusal to convert to Islam and abandon the Sikh faith.  On 26 December 1705, Fateh Singh was killed in this manner at Sirhind along with his elder brother, Zorawar Singh.  Gurdwara Fatehgarh Sahib which is situated 5 km north of Sirhind marks the site of the execution of the two younger sons of Guru Gobind Singh at the behest of Wazir Khan of Kunjpura, the Governor of Sirhind. The three shrines exist within this Gurdwara complex to mark the exact spot where these tragic events were witnessed in 1705.  

Jezzar Pasha, the Ottoman governor of provinces in modern Lebanon, and Palestine from 1775 to 1804, was infamous for his cruelties. When building the new walls of Beirut, he was charged with, among other things, the following:

Staying as a diplomat in Persia from 1860 to 1863, E. B. Eastwick met at one time, the Sardar i Kull, or military high commander, Aziz Khan. Eastwick notes that he "did not strike me as one who would greatly err on the side of leniency". Eastwick was told that just recently, Aziz Khan had ordered 14 robbers walled up alive, two of them head-downwards. Staying for the year 1887–1888 primarily in Shiraz, Edward Granville Browne noted the gloomy reminders of a particularly bloodthirsty governor there, Firza Ahmed, who in his four years of office (ending circa 1880) had caused, for example, more than 700 hands cut off for various offences. Browne continues:

Immurement was practiced in Mongolia as recently as the early 20th century. It is not clear that all thus immured were meant to die of starvation. In a newspaper report from 1914, it is written:

During the Mughal-Sikh Wars, the two younger sons of Guru Gobind Singh were bricked alive under orders of Wazir Khan, the Mughal Governor of Sirhind after they refused to convert to Islam.

North Africa
In 1906, Hadj Mohammed Mesfewi, a cobbler from Marrakesh, was found guilty of murdering 36 women (the bodies were found buried underneath his shop and nearby). Due to the nature of his crimes, he was walled up alive. For two days his screams were heard incessantly before silence by the third day.

Sacrificial variations

Construction 

A number of cultures have tales and ballads containing as a motif the sacrifice of a human being to ensure the strength of a building. For example, there was a culture of human sacrifice in the construction of large buildings in East and Southeast Asia. Such practices ranged from da sheng zhuang (打生樁) in China, hitobashira in Japan, and myosade (မြို့စတေး) in Burma.

The folklore of many Southeastern European peoples refers to immurement as the mode of death for the victim sacrificed during the completion of a construction project, such as a bridge or fortress (mostly real buildings). The Castle of Shkodra is the subject of such stories in both the Albanian oral tradition and in the Slavic one: the Albanian version is The Legend of Rozafa, in which three brothers uselessly toiled at building walls that disappeared at night: when told that they had to bury one of their wives in the wall, they pledge to choose the one that will bring them luncheon the next day, and not to warn their respective spouse. Two brothers do, however (the topos of two fellows betraying one is common in Balkan poetry, cf. Miorița or the Song of Çelo Mezani), leave Rozafa, the wife of the honest brother, to die. She accepts her fate, but asks to leave exposed her foot (to rock the infant son's cradle), the breast (to feed him) and the hand (to stroke his hair).

One of the most famous versions of the same legend is the Serbian epic poem called The Building of Skadar (Зидање Скадра, Zidanje Skadra) published by Vuk Karadžić, after he recorded a folk song sung by a Herzegovinian storyteller named Old Rashko. The version of the song in the Serbian language  is the oldest collected version of the legend, and the first one which earned literary fame. The three brothers in the legend were represented by members of the noble Mrnjavčević family, Vukašin, Uglješa and Gojko. In 1824, Karadžić sent a copy of his folksong collection to Jacob Grimm, who was particularly enthralled by the poem. Grimm translated it into German, and described it as "one of the most touching poems of all nations and all times". Johann Wolfgang von Goethe published the German translation, but did not share Grimm's opinion because he found the poem's spirit "superstitiously barbaric". Alan Dundes, a famous folklorist, noted that Grimm's opinion prevailed and that the ballad continued to be admired by generations of folksingers and ballad scholars.

A very similar Romanian legend, that of Meşterul Manole, tells of the building of the Curtea de Argeș Monastery: ten expert masons, among whom Master Manole himself, are ordered by Neagu Voda to build a beautiful monastery, but incur the same fate, and decide to immure the wife who will bring them luncheon. Manole, working on the roof, sees her approach, and pleads with God to unleash the elements, in order to stop her, but in vain: when she arrives, he proceeds to wall her in, pretending to be doing so in jest, with his wife increasingly crying out in pain and distress. When the building is finished, Neagu Voda takes away the masons' ladders, fearing they will build a more beautiful building, and they try to escape but all fall to their deaths. Only from Manole's fall a stream is created.

Many other Bulgarian and Romanian folk poems and songs describe a bride offered for such purposes, and her subsequent pleas to the builders to leave her hands and breasts free, that she might still nurse her child. Later versions of the songs revise the bride's death; her fate to languish, entombed in the stones of the construction, is transmuted to her nonphysical shadow, and its loss yet leads to her pining away and eventual death.

Other variations include the Hungarian folk ballad "Kőmíves Kelemen" (Kelemen the Stonemason). This is the story of twelve unfortunate stonemasons tasked with building the fort of Déva (a real building). To remedy its recurring collapses, it is agreed that one of the builders must sacrifice his bride, and the bride to be sacrificed will be she who first comes to visit. In some versions of the ballad the victim is shown some mercy; rather than being trapped alive she is burned and only her ashes are immured.

A Greek story "The Bridge of Arta" describes numerous failed attempts to build a bridge in that city. A cycle whereby a team of skilled builders toils all day only to return the next morning to find their work demolished is eventually ended when the master mason's wife is immured. Legend has it that a maiden was immured in the walls of Madliena church as a sacrifice or offering after continuous failed attempts at building it. The pastor achieved this by inviting all of the most beautiful maidens to a feast and the most beautiful one, Madaļa, falling into a deep sleep after he had offered her wine from a "certain goblet".

Ceremonial
Within Inca culture, it is reported that one element in the great Sun festival was the sacrifice of young maidens (between ten and twelve years old), who after their ceremonial duties were done were lowered down in a waterless cistern and were immured alive. The children of Llullaillaco represent another form of Incan child sacrifice.

Acknowledging the traditions of human sacrifice in the context of the building of structures within German and Slavic folklore, Jacob Grimm offers some examples of the sacrifice of animals as well. According to him, within Danish traditions, a lamb was immured under an erected altar in order to preserve it, while a churchyard was to be ensured protection by immuring a living horse as part of the ceremony. In the ceremonies of erection of other types of constructions, Grimm notices that other animals were sacrificed as well, such as pigs, hens and dogs.

Harold Edward Bindloss, in his 1898 non-fiction In the Niger country, writes the following transpiring when a great chief died:
 Similarly, the 14th century traveller Ibn Batuta observed the burial of a great khan:

In popular culture

At the end of Verdi's opera Aida the Egyptian General Radames is found guilty of treason and is immured in a cave as punishment. Once the cave is enclosed, he discovers that his lover Aida has secreted herself in the cave to be with him, and they die there together.

Edgar Allan Poe's short story "The Cask of Amontillado" involves the narrator murdering a rival by immuring him in a crypt.

Ariana Franklin's Mistress of the Art of Death (2007) includes the execution of a nun (who, because of her religious status, may not be injured) by walling her into her cell.

At the end of the 1955 movie Land of the Pharaohs, scheming Princess Nellifer (Joan Collins) is shocked to learn that she has been immured in the tomb of her husband Pharaoh Khufu (Jack Hawkins).

The song "London Bridge Is Falling Down" is sometimes also thought to be about live entombment.

See also

 "The Cask of Amontillado"
 Dried cat
 Oubliette
 Life imprisonment
 Human sacrifice
 Anarkali

References

Bibliography

Execution methods
Causes of death
Starvation
Dehydration